Magnús Óláfsson (died 1265) was King of Mann and the Isles.

Magnús Óláfsson may also refer to:

Magnus the Good (1024–1047), or Magnus I, King of Norway
Magnus Barefoot (1073–1103), or Magnus III, King of Norway
Magnús Ólafsson (swimmer) (born 1967), Icelandic swimmer